Ireland has diplomatic relations with 161 other governments. Ireland has numerous embassies and consulates abroad.

Honorary consulates and the overseas offices of Irish state agencies, namely Bord Bia, Enterprise Ireland, IDA Ireland, and Tourism Ireland, are omitted from this listing.

Current missions

Africa

Americas

Asia

Europe

Oceania

Multilateral organisations

Gallery

Closed missions

Africa

Asia

Future missions 
In September 2022, Minister for Foreign affairs Simon Coveney announced the creation of three new missions.

 
Islamabad (Embassy)

 
Milan (Consulate-General)

 
Munich (Consulate-General)

See also
 Foreign relations of Ireland
 Department of Foreign Affairs (Ireland)
 List of diplomatic missions in Ireland
 Visa policy of Ireland
 Irish Aid

Notes

References

External links

Department of Foreign Affairs

 
Ireland
Diplomatic missions